Maciel may refer to:

People
 Maciel (surname), a Portuguese surname
 Maciel (footballer, born 1972) (Maciel Luiz Franco), Brazilian footballer
 Maciel (footballer, born 1978) (Maciel Lima Barbosa da Cunha), Brazilian footballer
 Maciel (footballer, born 2000) (Lucas Maciel Felix), Brazilian footballer
 Maciel Monteiro (disambiguation), several people
 Maciel Santos (born 1985), Brazilian boccia player

Others
 Hospital Maciel, Montevideo, Uruguay
 Maciel, Paraguay, a district of the Caazapá Department

See also